Rosemary Namuli Karuga (19 June 1928 - 9 February 2021) was a Kenyan visual artist. In 2017, she was named Artist of the Month by the National Museums of Kenya. She is known to be the first woman artist to have studied at Makerere University.

Early years and education 
Karuga was born on 19 June 1928. in Meru, Kenya to a Ugandan father and a Kenyan mother She was the first female graduate of the Margaret Trowell School of Industrial and Fine Arts, Makerere University in Kampala between 1950 and 1952 where she studied design, painting and sculpture and an art educator in rural Kenya until her retirement (1989), when she became artist in residence at Nairobi’s Paa ya Paa Arts Centre. She was the only woman in Studio Museum Harlem’s exhibition Contemporary African Artists: Changing Tradition (1990), and received a lifetime achievement award from the African Voice newspaper. Her work lives on in several collections, including the Red Hill Gallery, National Museums of Kenya, Murumbi Trust, and the Watatu Foundation. She passed on at the age of ninety-three at the Amberley Nursing Home in Dublin, Ireland where she lived with her daughter. In 2006 she moved to live with family and obtain medical attention in Ireland.She lived there until her death on 9 February 2021.

Career 
After completing her education at Makerere University in Kampala, she moved back to Kenya worked as a teacher. She retired from teaching in the 1980s to pursue arts professionally. In 1987, she became an Artist in Residence at the Paa ya Paa Arts Centre in Nairobi. She usually created collage arts using the paper packaging from Rexona soap and Unga flour. In the 1990s she was commissioned to illustrate Amos Tutuola’s magical book, The Palm Wine Drinkard. Subsequently, her collage ‘illustrations’ was exhibited in Paris, London and in the Studio Museum in Harlem, USA.

Personal life 
She got married in 1953, the couple having three children.

References

2021 deaths
Kenyan artists
Kenyan women artists
Makerere University alumni
1928 births
Kenyan expatriates in Uganda
Kenyan expatriates in the United Kingdom
People from Meru County
Place of death missing